Gianfranco Rosi (born 5 August 1957) retired Italian boxer who was a two-time world champion in the light-middleweight division.

Amateur career

Rosi had a record of 94 wins - 2 losses - 4 draws.

Highlights:

 1976 Italian Light-Welterweight Champion
 1977 Italian Welterweight Champion

Professional career

Rosi turned pro in 1979 and won the WBC light-middleweight title in 1987 by decisioning Lupe Aquino. He lost the belt in 1988 when he was dominated by Donald Curry. Rosi was down once in 2nd, 4th and 8th and down twice in 7th, failing to answer the bell starting the 10th round.

In 1989 he won the IBF light-middleweight title by outpointing the undefeated Darrin Van Horn. He went on to successfully defend the title an impressive 11 times. In 1994 he had a technical draw against Vincent Pettway, and in the rematch later that year Pettway KO'd Rosi, ending his long reign.

In 1995 he took on WBO light-middleweight title holder Verno Phillips and won a decision, but Rosi failed a drug test and Phillips was reinstated as champion. The result of the bout was changed to a No Contest. In 1997 he lost a rematch to Phillips and retired.

In 2003 he came out of retirement, and finally retired in 2006 at the age of 49 with a pro record of 62 wins (18 KOs), 6 losses, and 1 draw.

Professional boxing record

See also
List of world light-middleweight boxing champions

References

External links

 

|-

1957 births
Living people
Italian male boxers
People from Assisi
Sportspeople from the Province of Perugia
Welterweight boxers
World light-middleweight boxing champions
European Boxing Union champions
World Boxing Council champions
International Boxing Federation champions